The Indie-Verse was an internet audio station based in Dallas, Texas that served the Dallas/Fort Worth Metroplex as well as all of the United States through its internet presence with a diverse alternative & indie music format. It was also broadcast on KJKK 100.3 HD-3 (HD Radio needed) and was under ownership of CBS Radio. The name was a portmanteau of "Indie", short for "independence" or "independent"; and "Universe".


History
The Indie-Verse began as an internet-only station on May 9, 2008, broadcasting primarily an indie rock music playlist. Then on July that year, CBS Radio gave the station staff the green light to broadcast from an FM HD frequency on KLLI (now KRLD-FM) 105.3 HD2. The duration on its former FM dial didn't last long as it was replaced by a simulcast from KRLD NewsRadio 1080 AM on June 9, 2009. This replacement happened because of the new Microsoft Zune player's feature: which allows listeners to hear HD stations as well as their MP3s, but, turns out, won't be able to tune into the AM dials. So, in order to make sure KRLD 1080's news feed still got out to the ever-evolving listenership, CBS bumped The Indie-Verse in order to make room. However, The Indie-Verse continued to maintain its online presence.

Sometime in late 2010, The Indie-Verse returned to the radio airwaves, this time on KJKK 100.3 HD-3.

As of June 1, 2016 at 12:00 a.m. (central), The Indie-Verse has been shut down entirely and replaced with a classic country format. The last song before going off the air was "Avocado, Baby" by Los Campesinos!. No formal announcement has been made of this format change. The station's website redirects to Jack FM's website, and their Facebook page was deleted.

References

Indie
Indie
Indie
Indie
Indie
Defunct mass media in Texas